Anne Marie "Ree" Drummond (née Smith, born January 6, 1969) is an American blogger, author, food writer, photographer and television personality who lives on a working ranch outside of Pawhuska, Oklahoma with her husband. In February 2010, she was listed as No. 22 on Forbes Top 25 Web Celebrities. Her blog, The Pioneer Woman, which documents Drummond's daily life as a ranch wife and mother, was named Weblog of the Year 2009, 2010 and 2011 at the Annual Weblog Awards (The Bloggies).

Capitalizing on the success of her blog, Drummond stars in her own television program, also entitled The Pioneer Woman, on The Food Network which began in 2011. She has also appeared on Good Morning America, Today Show, The View, The Chew and The Bonnie Hunt Show. She has been featured in Ladies' Home Journal, Woman's Day, People and Southern Living. She has also written numerous cookbooks, a children's book, and an autobiography. In 2015, Drummond launched a “homey lifestyle” product line that has become very popular with the public. Cookware, cutlery, appliances, clothing and outdoor living products are currently marketed under the brand name The Pioneer Woman.

Early life
Anne Marie, nicknamed Ree, grew up in a home overlooking the grounds of a country club in the oil town of Bartlesville, Oklahoma, with two brothers, Doug and Mike, and a younger sister, Betsy. She graduated from Bartlesville High School in 1987 after which she left Oklahoma to attend college in Los Angeles, California. She graduated from the University of Southern California in 1991, having first studied journalism before switching to gerontology. After graduation she hoped to attend law school in Chicago, but her plans changed unexpectedly when she met and married her husband, Ladd Drummond.

Her father, William Dale Smith, an orthopedic surgeon, and her mother Gerre Schwert are divorced. "Bill" Smith, as he is more commonly known, later married his current wife, Patsy.

Drummond was raised Episcopalian. She is an alumna of Pi Beta Phi sorority.

Blog  at ThePioneerWoman.com
Drummond began blogging in May 2006, initially using the subdomain pioneerwoman.typepad.com within the Typepad blogging service. She registered her own domain thepioneerwoman.com on October 18, 2006. Drummond's blog, The Pioneer Woman, was originally titled Confessions of a Pioneer Woman. The latter is now the title of a section within the site. The site is hosted by Rackspace.

Drummond writes about topics such as ranch life and homeschooling.  About a year after launching her blog, she posted her first recipe and a tutorial on "How to Cook a Steak". The tutorial was accompanied by 20 photos explaining the cooking process in what she calls "ridiculous detail".  Her stories about her husband, family, and country living, and her step-by-step cooking instructions and elaborate food photography, proved highly popular with readers.  Confessions of a Pioneer Woman won honors at the Weblog Awards (also known as the Bloggies) in 2007, 2008, 2009, and 2010. In 2009 and 2010 it took the top prize as Weblog of the Year.

As of September 2009, Drummond's blog reportedly received 13 million page views per month. On May 9, 2011, the blog's popularity had risen to approximately 23.3 million page views per month and 4.4 million unique visitors. According to an article in The New Yorker, "This is roughly the same number of people who read The Daily Beast". An article in the Toronto newspaper The Globe and Mail described it as "[s]lickly photographed with legions of fans . . . arguably the mother of all farm girl blogs." The blog has been referenced in the Los Angeles Times, The New York Times, and BusinessWeek.  In 2009, Time named Drummond's Confessions of a Pioneer Woman one of the "25 Best Blogs" in the world. Estimates for her site's income suggest it earns $1 million or more per year from display (advertisement) income.

Food community (TastyKitchen.com)
 In April 2008, Drummond held a giveaway contest in the cooking section of her blog The Pioneer Woman in which she asked readers to share one of their favorite recipes.  The response was an unexpected 5,000+ recipes in less than 24 hours. She realized that she had not only grown a community of loyal readers but a community of food lovers as well. She immediately sought a way to catalog the recipes and make them searchable for all.

A little over a year later, on July 14, 2009, Drummond announced the launch of TastyKitchen.com – a simple and free online community website with the tagline Favorite Recipes from Real Kitchens Everywhere!. The site was built for her food-loving readers as a place where they could easily contribute, search for and print recipes. In addition to sharing recipes, users can create personal membership profiles and communicate with one another via posts and direct messages. Users also have the ability to rate and review recipes.

Books
The Pioneer Woman Cooks: Recipes from an Accidental Country Girl
Drummond's first cookbook, The Pioneer Woman Cooks: Recipes from an Accidental Country Girl, was published in October 2009 after reaching the top spot on Amazon.com's preorder list for hardcover books.  A New York Times reviewer described Drummond as "funny, enthusiastic and self-deprecating", and commented: "Vegetarians and gourmands won’t find much to cook here, but as a portrait of a real American family kitchen, it works."

Black Heels to Tractor Wheels
In 2007, Drummond began writing a series on her blog titled From Black Heels to Tractor Wheels. In the series, she chronicled her personal love story detailing how, in the process of relocating from Los Angeles to Chicago, she wound up settling down with a cowboy on a cattle ranch in rural Oklahoma. In February 2011, the series was compiled into a book and published by William Morrow, an imprint of HarperCollins. It quickly rose to No. 2 on both The New York Times Best Seller list for hardcover nonfiction and The Wall Street Journal's list.

Charlie the Ranch Dog
In April 2011, Drummond published a children's book titled Charlie the Ranch Dog, featuring her family's beloved Basset Hound Charlie. According to Publishers Weekly, “Adult readers will recognize in Charlie’s voice the understated humor that has made Drummond’s blog so successful; kids should find it irresistible.” The book was illustrated by Diane deGroat, an illustrator of more than 120 children's books.

The Pioneer Woman Cooks: Food from My Frontier
Drummond's second cookbook, The Pioneer Woman Cooks: Food from My Frontier,  released in March 2012 and was a #1 New York Times Bestseller.

Charlie and the Christmas Kitty
Diane deGroat again illustrates this children book about the family's Basset Hound. Released in December 2012.

The Pioneer Woman Cooks: A Year of Holidays: 140 Step-by-Step Recipes for Simple, Scrumptious Celebrations
A cookbook for holidays throughout the year. Released October 29, 2013.

Charlie and the New Baby
Another children's book about the family's basset hound, illustrated by Diane deGroat. Released on April 29, 2014.

Charlie the Ranch Dog: Charlie Goes to the Doctor
An I Can Read story about Charlie the basset hound's trip to the doctor, illustrated by Diane deGroat. Released June 17, 2014.

Charlie the Ranch Dog: Stuck in the Mud
An I Can Read story about Charlie the basset hound, illustrated by Diane deGroat. Released January 6, 2015.

Charlie Plays Ball
A Children's book about Charlie the basset hound, illustrated by Diane deGroat. Released March 24, 2015.

The Pioneer Woman Cooks: Dinnertime
A cookbook featuring 125 dinner recipes. Released October 20, 2015.

Charlie the Ranch Dog: Rock Star
An I Can Read story about Charlie the basset hound, illustrated by Diane deGroat. Released November 17, 2015.

Little Ree
A children's book about a little girl named Ree and her adventures in the country, illustrated by Jacqueline Rogers. Released March 28, 2017 

The Pioneer Woman Cooks: Come and Get It!
A cookbook featuring 120 simple and delicious recipes. Released October 24, 2017.

Little Ree: Best Friends Forever!
A children's book about a little girl named Ree and her best friend, Hyacinth, illustrated by Jacqueline Rogers. Released March 27, 2018 

The Pioneer Woman Cooks: Super Easy!
This cookbook is perfect for the families who are always on the move! Not only does it provide simple recipes, but it also clues you in on some "shortcut ingredients". Released October 19, 2021.

Ree's Best Family Meals
This spiralbound cookbook allows you to plan a meal every night of the week! With the new format of the spiral bound book and the step by step instructions with photos, your meal planning was just made easier. Released online August 2, 2022.

Television
Drummond made her television debut on an episode of Throwdown! with Bobby Flay  when the celebrity chef was challenged by her (in a change from the show's normal format) to a special Thanksgiving face-off. Flay traveled to her Oklahoma ranch for the event. The episode aired on the Food Network on Wednesday, November 17, 2010. Drummond's home cooking beat Flay's gourmet-style spread in a tight contest. Music artist and fellow Oklahoma resident Trisha Yearwood was one of the judges.

In April 2011, the Food Network announced that Drummond would host her own daytime television series on the network. The Pioneer Woman premiered on Saturday, August 27, 2011.

Film
On March 19, 2010, Drummond confirmed media reports that Columbia Pictures had acquired the film rights to her book From Black Heels to Tractor Wheels. The production company was reported to be in talks with Reese Witherspoon to star as Drummond in a motion picture based on the book. As of 2023, no further information has been released about this project.

Personal life
On September 21, 1996, Drummond married Ladd Drummond (born January 22, 1969), a fourth-generation member of the prominent Osage County cattle ranching Drummond family whom she refers to as "the Marlboro Man" in her books and her blog. They spent their honeymoon in Australia and lived on a remote working cattle ranch approximately 8 miles west of Pawhuska, Oklahoma.  They have five children – Alex, Paige, Bryce, Jamar and Todd. Alex and her husband Mauricio Scott are graduates of Texas A&M University. Paige is a graduate of the University of Arkansas and Bryce is a student and plays football at the University of North Texas.  Their foster son Jamar is a student and football player at the University of Central Oklahoma. Ladd's second cousin is Gentner Drummond.

In late 2016, the Drummonds opened The Mercantile, a restaurant retail store located in a 100-year-old downtown Pawhuska building that they bought and began renovating in 2012.

In 2018, the Drummonds opened a bed and breakfast in downtown Pawhuska, "The Boarding House", as well as a pizzeria, "P-Town Pizza". The Drummonds opened "Charlie's Sweet Shop", an ice cream and candy shop, in 2020. The shop was named for their basset hound Charlie, who died in 2017 and was the inspiration for Drummond's "Charlie" children's book series.

Awards

References

External links
The Pioneer Woman official website
Tasty Kitchen food community
Pioneer Woman cooking show on Food Network

 Ree Drummond on IMDB

1969 births
21st-century American non-fiction writers
21st-century American women writers
American bloggers
American food writers
American television chefs
American women bloggers
American women chefs
Food Network chefs
Living people
Ree Drummond
People from Bartlesville, Oklahoma
Women cookbook writers